The Women's 4 × 100 metre medley relay competition at the 2017 World Championships was held on 30 July 2017.

Records
Prior to the competition, the existing world and championship records were as follows.

The following new records were set during this competition.

Results

Heats
The heats were held at 10:14.

Final
The final was held at 19:07.

References

Women's 4 x 100 metre medley relay
2017 in women's swimming